Luis Fernando Betancur is a Puerto Rican international footballer who plays for the Puerto Rico national football team.

Career

Betancur joined the Florida International University Panthers in 2013.  He has been a regular player for the team, scoring 12 goals in his first 45 games at the NCAA level.

Betancur made his senior international debut with Puerto Rico against the United States on May 22, 2016.  Betancur scored his first international goal in that same game, scoring a volley from 25 yards in the 42nd minute.

Statistics

References

External links
FIU bio

1995 births
Living people
Puerto Rican footballers
Puerto Rico international footballers
Puerto Rican expatriate footballers
FIU Panthers men's soccer players
USL League Two players
Soccer players from Florida
Sportspeople from Ponce, Puerto Rico
Sportspeople from Broward County, Florida
Association football forwards
American soccer players
Weston FC players
People from Parkland, Florida